93 Park or 93rd Street Park (Parque de la calle 93, commonly known as Parque de la 93) is a commercial and recreational park located at the 93rd Street (calle 93) in El Chicó, in the north of Bogota, Colombia. Is one of Bogota's most popular shopping, night club and restaurant areas.

History

20th century 
The park emerged as a result of the immense growth and expansion of Bogotá to the north on the Bogotá savanna. The affluent neighbourhood El Chicó is part of the locality Chapinero. After the expansion of Bogotá north into Chapinero, this area, together with the Zona T, became the centers of nightlife and entertainment in the city.

21st century 
In the beginning of the 21st century, the park became the most popular park in the north of Bogota, where public venues as entertainment, publicly viewed football matches were shown. The park also hosts temporary expositions. With Christmas, the park is decorated with lighting and a large Christmas tree is erected in the park.

Location 
The park is a center of nightlife in Bogota, located in the district of Chapinero where clubs, restaurants, shops, art galleries, auctions, design centers are abundant.

Places of interest 
The most notable are the restaurants around the park, as Café Renault, Gato Negro, Juan Valdez café, the beautiful gardens, and design centers and nightclubs in the surrounding area.

At the western park edge, Colombia's first Starbucks was opened in 2015.

Accessibility 
The park can be accessed from the main Carreras 11 and 15.

See also 

 Simon Bolivar Park

References

External links 

Parks in Bogotá